Éric Elmosnino (born 2 May 1964) is a French actor and musician. He is known internationally for portraying Serge Gainsbourg in Gainsbourg, for which he won the César Award for Best Actor.

He studied at the National Conservatory of Dramatic Art. After leaving the Conservatory, he worked at the Théâtre Nanterre-Amandiers with Jean-Pierre Vincent. 

In 1992 he played Christian Ribet, a friend of Guillaume de Tonquédec, in the film Tableau d'honneur (Honour Roll) by Charles Nemes. In 2006, he played in the theater as Edward Bond, directed by Alain Francon, at the Avignon Festival and the Théâtre de la Colline in Paris. In January 2008, he performed in a show at the Theatre Antoine in Paris for Yasmina Reza's God of Carnage.

Early life
Elmosnino was born in the Paris suburbs to a Sephardic Jewish (Moroccan-Jewish) father who was an industrial designer at Thomson CSF, and to an Alsatian mother who left EDF to raise her children.

Selected filmography

Awards and nominations

References

External links

 
 

1964 births
Living people
Best Actor César Award winners
French male film actors
French male stage actors
French musicians
French people of Moroccan-Jewish descent
People from Suresnes
French National Academy of Dramatic Arts alumni
20th-century French male actors
21st-century French male actors
French theatre directors
Jewish French male actors